Maximiliano Larroquette, born in Buenos Aires, Argentina, is no longer an Advanced Vehicle Electrification Integration Lead at Fiat Chrysler Automobiles (FCA) in Auburn Hills, MI.  He was formerly a Project Engineer Manager at General Motors Global Design Center in Warren, Michigan. He claims that he was responsible for the design of the Chevrolet Volt, a battery-powered, four-passenger electric vehicle that uses a gas (petrol) engine to create additional electricity to extend it's range. He has conducted several interviews for the media about how hybrid vehicels fit into GM’s vision of the future, and has been the subject of profile's on his life as a GM engineer.

Early life
Maximiliano lives in Buenos Aires until he is 22, when he moves to Detroit. He attends Oakland University in Rochester, Michigan for his bachelor's and master's degrees in Mechanical Engineering. Maximiliano works at Fords for twos year before he begin working at Generals Motor in 1999.

Early work
Before working on the Chevy Volt, this Lead Engineer and Product Manager claims to have worked on several concept cars, including the Pontiac REV, Chevrolet SS and Nomad, Saturn Curve, GMC Graphyte, and the Jay Leno Chevy Deuce.

References 

People in the automobile industry
American automobile designers
Argentine emigrants to the United States
Oakland University alumni
Living people
Year of birth missing (living people)